Flinders Group National Park (Cape York Peninsula Aboriginal Land) is a national park in Queensland (Australia), 1,745 km northwest of Brisbane. The national park was previously named Flinders Group National Park until it was renamed on 28 November 2013.

This national park has a tropical climate, with a humid season from December to April, when temperatures exceed 30 degrees Celsius.

Many species of land and sea birds are represented here.

Protected islands

References

See also

 Protected areas of Queensland

National parks of Far North Queensland
Protected areas established in 1939
1939 establishments in Australia